The Fury is an Australian novel by E. V. Timms. It was the seventh in his Great South Land Saga of novels.

The book was a best seller.

References

External links
The Fury at AustLit

1954 Australian novels
Angus & Robertson books